Pterostylis macrocalymma, commonly known as the large-hooded rufous greenhood or Murchison rustyhood is a plant in the orchid family Orchidaceae and is endemic to the south-west of Western Australia. Both flowering and non-flowering plants have a relatively large rosette of leaves. Flowering plants also have up to ten or more white flowers with bold green or pale brown lines and a broad spoon-shaped, insect-like labellum.

Description
Pterostylis macrocalymma is a terrestrial,  perennial, deciduous, herb with an underground tuber and a rosette of between six and ten leaves. Flowering plants have a rosette at the base of the flowering stem but the leaves are usually withered by flowering time. Flowering occurs from August to early October.

Taxonomy and naming
Pterostylis macrocalymma was first formally described in 1989 by Mark Clements and David Jones from a specimen collected near where the North West Coastal Highway crosses the Murchison River. The description was published in Australian Orchid Research. The specific epithet (macrocalymma) is derived from the Ancient Greek words makros meaning "long" and kalymma meaning "a covering", "hood" or "veil" referring to the large galea of this orchid.

Distribution and habitat
The large-hooded rufous greenhood grows in woodland and shrubland and on granite outcrops between Moora, Woodanilling and Esperance in the Geraldton Sandplains biogeographic region.

Conservation
Pterostylis macrocalymma is classified as "Priority One" by the Western Australian Government Department of Parks and Wildlife, meaning that it is known from only one or a few locations which are potentially at risk.

References

macrocalymma
Endemic orchids of Australia
Orchids of Western Australia
Plants described in 1989